John Gerald Schwegmann (August 12, 1911  March 6, 1995) was an American businessman, a member of the Louisiana House of Representatives, and a member of the Louisiana Public Service Commission. In 1971, he unsuccessfully ran for Governor of Louisiana. Additionally, he founded Schwegmann Bank & Trust Co. As a businessman and a chief executive officer of Schwegmann Brothers Giant Supermarkets, he at times challenged the fair trade laws.

References

Members of the Louisiana House of Representatives
Businesspeople from Louisiana
1911 births
1995 deaths
20th-century American businesspeople
20th-century American politicians